The ochre-bellied boobook (Ninox ochracea) is a species of owl in the family Strigidae.
It is endemic to Sulawesi, Indonesia. Its natural habitats are subtropical or tropical dry forests and subtropical or tropical moist lowland forests. It is threatened by habitat loss.

References

ochre-bellied boobook
Endemic birds of Sulawesi
ochre-bellied boobook
Taxonomy articles created by Polbot